Pultenaea rostrata is a species of flowering plant in the family Fabaceae and is endemic to eastern Australia. It is an erect shrub with elliptic to linear, oblong to club-shaped leaves and yellow to orange and reddish-brown, pea-like flowers.

Description

Taxonomy and naming
Pultenaea rostrata was first formally described in 2002 by Rogier Petrus Johannes de Kok in Australian Systematic Botany from specimens collected by Mary Tindale near Angourie in 1973. The specific epithet (rostrata) means "beaked", and refers to the point on the ends of the sepal lobes.

Distribution and habitat
This pultenaea grows in coastal heath and scrub in south-eastern Queensland and north-eastern New South Wales as far south as Coffs Harbour.

References

rostrata
Flora of New South Wales
Flora of Queensland
Plants described in 2002